Fabricio Gerardo Alvarado Muñoz (born 30 May 1974) is a Costa Rican politician, singer and undergraduate journalist.

Biography 
He was once a deputy in the Legislative Assembly, representing the San José Province. He is also a musician, having released a number of songs in the Christian genre. A member of the conservative National Restoration Party (and its only lawmaker for the 2014–2018 period) he was also the party's presidential nominee for the 2018 general election, ultimately losing to Carlos Alvarado Quesada. According to the BBC, his campaign gained in popularity because of his opposition to same-sex marriage. 

On 23 October 2018 Alvarado announced his resignation to National Restoration Party and the start of a new party named New Republic. His campaign is under investigation by the Ministerio Público after the Tribunal Supremo de Elecciones reported that it had found three providers of services on the elections that had been paid by cash, something that is illegal in Costa Rica.

Alvarado signed the Madrid Charter, a document drafted by the far-right Spanish party Vox that describes left-wing groups as enemies of Ibero-America involved in a "criminal project" that are "under the umbrella of the Cuban regime".

Electoral performance

Presidential

Personal life 
Alvarado Muñoz is a devout Evangelical Christian.

See also
 Evangelical political parties in Latin America

References

1974 births
Living people
People from San José, Costa Rica
Costa Rican evangelicals
Costa Rican male singers
Costa Rican performers of Christian music
Members of the Legislative Assembly of Costa Rica
Costa Rican anti-same-sex-marriage activists
Right-wing populism in North America
Signers of the Madrid Charter